Brian H. Seitz is an American politician serving as a member of the Missouri House of Representatives from the 156th district, representing Branson, Missouri. Elected in November 2020, he assumed office on January 6, 2021.

Early life and education 
Seitz was born in Michigan. He earned a Bachelor of Arts degree in communications and public relations from Missouri State University in 1990.

Career 
From 1983 to 1986, Seitz served in the United States Army. He later managed Splash Carwash and was a pastor at Sovereign Grace Baptist Church and the First Baptist Church of Branson. Seitz was elected to the Missouri House of Representatives in November 2020 and assumed office on January 6, 2021.

In March 2022, Seitz introduced Missouri House Bill No. 2810, which garnered national attention for its ban on the use of abortion pills for ectopic pregnancies.

References 

Living people
Missouri Republicans
Members of the Mississippi House of Representatives
People from Branson, Missouri
Missouri State University alumni
Year of birth missing (living people)